The 1952–53 season was the 80th season of competitive football in Scotland and the 56th season of the Scottish Football League.

Scottish League Division A

Rangers won the title with a 1–1 draw in their last match, away to Queen of the South. Rangers equalised with 17 minutes to go and thereby won the league on goal average from Hibernian, thus preventing Hibs from winning their third title in a row.

Champions: Rangers
Relegated: Motherwell, Third Lanark

Scottish League Division B

Promoted: Stirling Albion, Hamilton Academical

Scottish League Division C

Cup honours

Other Honours

National

County

 * - aggregate over two legs
  - trophy shared

Highland League

Scotland national team

Scotland and England shared victory in the 1953 British Home Championship.

Key:
 (H) = Home match
 (A) = Away match
 BHC = British Home Championship

Notes and references

External links
Scottish Football Historical Archive

 
Seasons in Scottish football